The 1945 Amateur World Series was the eighth edition of the Amateur World Series (AWS), an international men's amateur baseball tournament. The tournament was sanctioned by the International Baseball Federation (which titled it the Baseball World Cup as of the 1988 tournament). The tournament took place, for the second time, in Venezuela, which had also hosted the previous (1944) tournament. It was contested by six national teams playing ten games each from October 27 through November 18 in Caracas.

Both Cuba and  Mexico boycotted this AWS in protest of the events of the previous edition, when controversy surrounded the tournament regarding umpiring decisions, which had led to forfeits of games and general ill-will. 

The host Venezuelan team finished undefeated with a perfect 10–0 record, winning its second consecutive gold medal and third overall.

Colombia finished in second place with a 7–3 record and won silver for its first medal in series history, while Panama went 6–4 for a bronze medal. It was also the first medal for the Panamanians in the tournament. 

Nicaragua, a former silver medalist both in 1939 and 1940, placed fourth at 5–5. The Costa Rica and El Salvador teams debuted in the Series and shared last place with a 1–9 mark.

Héctor Benítez of Venezuela earned Most Valuable Player honors after leading the hitter in batting average (.526), hits (20), RBI (16) and runs scored (16). Teammate Luis Zuloaga was the top pitcher with a 4–0 record, while setting a Series record with seven consecutive wins. Other statistical leaders for Venezuela were Ramón Fernández, with 21 hits, and Luis Romero Petit, who stole nine bases.   

Another well observed performance came from Panamanian catcher León Kellman, who was the only player to hit two home runs in the Series. Previously, in 1941, Kellman was the only player to homer in the Series.

Final standings

References
 Bjarkman, P. (2007). A History of Cuban Baseball, 1864–2006. McFarland & Company. .
 Baseball World Cup History
 Historia de la Copa Mundial de Béisbol (Spanish)

Amateur World Series, 1945
Baseball World Cup
1945
1945 in Venezuelan sport
October 1945 sports events in South America
November 1945 sports events in South America
Sports competitions in Caracas
20th century in Caracas